The 2017–2018 Israel Football League season was the 11th season of the Israel Football League. Only seven teams competed this season, with the Ramat HaSharon Hammers going on hiatus. The season concluded with the Jerusalem Lions defeating the Petah Tikva Troopers, 28-20, in Israel Bowl XI.

Regular season 
The regular season consisted of ten games, with the top six teams qualifying for the playoffs. The Lions earned the top seed in the playoffs with an undefeated record.

Playoffs 
The Troopers defeated the Silverbacks while the Pioneers upset the Underdogs in the Wild Card Round. In the Semifinals, the Lions defeated the Pioneers and the Troopers upset the Rebels. Israel Bowl XI took place on March 22, 2018 at the Kraft Family Sports Campus, with the Lions defeating the Troopers 28-20 and David Abell being named Israel Bowl MVP for the second year in a row.

References 

Israel Football League Seasons